The Namibia National Olympic Committee (IOC code: NAM) is the National Olympic Committee representing Namibia. It was created in 1990 and recognised by the IOC in 1992

Namibia made its debut at the 1992 Summer Olympics in Barcelona where it was represented by six athletes.

Presidents of Committee
 present – Agnes Tjongarero

See also
Namibia at the Olympics
Namibia at the Commonwealth Games

References

Namibia
Namibia
 
Sports governing bodies of Namibia